The Faculty of Business is a constituent body of the University of Wollongong, Australia. The Faculty offers undergraduate, postgraduate coursework degrees and postgraduate research degrees. The Faculty also offers graduate programs through the University of Wollongong Sydney Business School which is a QS World University Rankings  ranked 22nd in the Asia-Pacific region by QS in the 2014/2015.

Organisation
The Faculty comprises three schools and two entities:
 Sydney Business School
 The School of Accounting, Economics and Finance
 The School of Management, Operations and Marketing
 Australian Health Services Research Institute
 SMART Infrastructure Facility

The Faculty also comprises three areas of research:
Centre for Contemporary Australasian Business and Economics Studies
Centre for Human & Social Capital Research
Centre for Responsible Organisations & Practices

Affiliations
The Faculty of Business is affiliated with a range of professional associations representing management education institutions, these include:
 The Association to Advance Collegiate Schools of Business (AACSB)
 The European Foundation for Management Development (EFMD)
 Principles for Responsible Management Education (PRME)
 The Association of Asia-Pacific Business Schools (AAPBS)

References

External links
 University of Wollongong Faculty of Business

Faculties of the University of Wollongong